Toby Christopher Barnard,  is emeritus fellow in history at Hertford College, University of Oxford. He joined the college in 1976 and retired in 2012. He was formerly lecturer in history at Royal Holloway (1970-1976). Barnard is a specialist in the political, social and cultural histories of Ireland and England, c. 1600–1800. His A New Anatomy of Ireland (2003) was notable for the depth of primary research that Barnard carried out to complete it. One reviewer commented that "This task of discovery and accumulation by itself is an heroic achievement."  Barnard is a fellow of the British Academy and the Royal Historical Society. He did his undergraduate studies at The Queen's College, Oxford, and was supervised for his DPhil by Hugh Trevor-Roper.

Works 

The English Republic, 1649-60. Longman, London, 1982. (Seminar Studies in History)
 Barnard, Toby, and Jane Fenlon (eds.). The Dukes of Ormonde, 1610-1745. Boydell Press, 2000.  
Cromwellian Ireland: A new anatomy of Ireland: the Irish Protestants, 1649-1770. Yale University Press, 2003.
Irish Protestant Ascents and Descents, 1641-1770. Four Courts Press, 2004. 
Making the Grand Figure: Lives and possessions in Ireland, 1641-1700. Yale University Press, 2004.  
The Kingdom of Ireland, 1641-1760. Palgrave Macmillan, 2004. 
A guide to the sources for the history of material culture in Ireland: 1500-2000. Four Courts Press, 2005.                 
Improving Ireland? Projectors, prophets and profiteers, 1641-1786. Four Courts Press, 2008. 
 Murdoch, Tessa (ed.), foreword by Toby Barnard (2022). Great Irish Households: Inventories from the Long Eighteenth Century. Cambridge: John Adamson, foreword, pp. 11–15

Contributions to the Oxford Dictionary of National Biography 

 – Baron Broghill 1628 to 1660

References 

Living people
Year of birth missing (living people)
Academics of the University of Oxford
Fellows of the British Academy
Fellows of the Royal Historical Society
Alumni of The Queen's College, Oxford
Academics of Royal Holloway, University of London